is a 2017 Japanese animated film series produced by Kyoto Animation and Animation Do. Eternal Summer, with new additional footage and redone scenes. A third film, Free! Take Your Marks, was included with the film's trilogy project, containing an all-new original story that serves as a sequel to the compilation films.

Plot

The Bond

In junior high school, Haruka Nanase joins the swim team, but quits after a falling out with his elementary school rival Rin Matsuoka, home from schooling in Australia, causing Haruka's teammate, Ikuya Kirishima, to resent him. The swim team disbands, as Asahi Shiina moves away and Ikuya studies abroad. In high school, Haruka prepares for tournaments with teammates Makoto Tachibana, Nagisa Hazuki, and Rei Ryugazaki, while Rin, who has since reconciled with them, does the same. Haruka is in his final year of high school, but has not yet made post-graduation plans, even after being scouted by a university during prefecturals. Meanwhile, Makoto becomes inspired to become a swim coach after helping Kisumi Shigino's little brother, Hayato, learn how to swim.

During regionals, Haruka is overwhelmed by the pressure of performing in front of university scouts and stops swimming in the middle of his individual event. When confronted about not having a dream by Rin, Haruka becomes uncharacteristically angry, which concerns his friends. Later, Makoto attempts to reason with Haruka, but they end up in a heated argument in which Makoto reveals his decision to attend university in Tokyo to fulfill his own dream. Haruka feels even more lost, but with prompting from Makoto, Rin takes Haruka with him back to Australia. The trip inspires Haruka to swim at the college level and upon returning to Japan, he makes amends with his team. With renewed hope and bonds with his friends, Haruka and his team place 6th overall in nationals.

In a post-credits scene, during nationals, Sosuke Yamazaki gets lost, only to end up watching the individual medleys, where Ikuya from Shionezaki High School overtakes everyone. After the tournament, Ikuya discusses his condition with his older brother, Natsuya Kirishima.

The Promise

Sosuke Yamazaki, Rin's best friend from childhood, transfers into his class at Samezuka Academy. Rin and Sosuke had promised each other as children to continue their swim careers together but unbeknownst to Rin, Sosuke has incurred a serious shoulder injury from overuse, yet continues to swim as they prepare for upcoming tournaments. While Rin is serious about swimming, Sosuke struggles to find a reason to continue, further straining their friendship.

At the regional tournament, Rin finally learns about Sosuke's injury. Sosuke, now cherishing the bonds he has forged with the swim team, is determined to participate in the team medley one last time. The team places second in the race, thus qualifying for nationals, and Sosuke decides to get medical treatment for his injury. Despite dropping out of the nationals, he offers to help Aiichiro Nitori and Momotaro Mikoshiba prepare.

In a post-credits scene, Sosuke warns Rin about Ikuya, whose freestyle resembles Haruka's in both form and speed. Meanwhile, Ikuya refuses to attend the nationals' awards ceremony to call Natsuya. Gou becomes determined to recruit new members for the next school year. Aiichiro, Momotaro, Nagisa, and Rei reaffirm their rivalry and plan a joint practice together. While Asahi exchanges farewells with his swim team at Kazami High School, he receives a text message from Kisumi. Haruka and Makoto arrive in Tokyo.

Production

Kyoto Animation announced that a "new screen project" had been green-lit in a promotional video for the home release of High Speed! Free! Starting Days. Details were announced at an event on March 19, 2017, where it was announced that the project would consist of two compilation films of Free! Eternal Summer, the series' second season. The trilogy also included a third companion film, Free! Take Your Marks, consisting of a direct sequel and an all-new original story.

The first film, focuses on the members of the Iwatobi Swim Club, and it was released in theaters on April 22, 2017. The second film, focuses on Rin and Sosuke, and it was released in theaters on July 1, 2017. Both films contained new additional footage and redone scenes. Clear file folders were distributed as limited theater gifts The Bond was released on Blu-ray and DVD on November 1, 2017, while The Promise was released on December 6, 2017. The Bond had a limited theater screening in Singapore and Indonesia on February 22, 2018, by Encore Films with Chinese and English subtitles. Encore Films later screened The Promise on March 15, 2018.

Funimation acquired the rights for Free! Timeless Medley, along with High Speed! Free! Starting Days and Free! Take Your Marks for distribution in North America. All films were released as a set in October 2018.

ReceptionThe Bond opened at #9 on its opening day and ranked #10 on its opening weekend. The film made  at box office. The home release debuted at #1 on both Oricon's DVD and Blu-ray charts, with 7,105 Blu-ray discs and 4,302 DVDs sold on its first week. The Promise'' opened at #8 on its opening day and ranked at #10 on its opening weekend. The film made  at box office. The Blu-ray release debuted at #1 on Oricon and sold 7,105 copies on its first week. The DVD release debuted at #2 on Oricon and sold 4,069 copies on its first week.

Soundtrack

The original soundtrack was produced by Tatsuya Kato, and it was released on July 31, 2017, under the name . The film's theme song, "Rising Free", is performed by Style Five, a group consisting of the voice actors for Haruka, Makoto, Nagisa, Rei, and Rin. "Rising Free" was released along with the soundtrack, which debuted at #17 on Oricon and charted for three weeks.

References

External links
  
 
 

2010s Japanese films
2017 anime films
Animated films based on animated series
Japanese film series
2010s Japanese-language films
Funimation
Kyoto Animation
Films set in Tottori Prefecture